Loxicha may refer to:

Places in Oaxaca, Mexico

Candelaria Loxicha
San Agustín Loxicha
San Baltazar Loxicha
San Bartolomé Loxicha
Santa Catarina Loxicha

Languages
Loxicha Zapotec
San Baltázar Loxicha Zapotec